Janakkala is a municipality of Finland. Its administrative centre is in Turenki, which is often erroneously shown on maps as being "Janakkala". Janakkala is located along the Highway 3 (E12) in the province of Southern Finland and is part of the Tavastia Proper region. To the south, Janakkala shares a boundary with Riihimäki, the Northern neighbour being Hämeenlinna.

In Janakkala the rate of unemployment is 9.7% and the rate of municipal taxes is %. The municipality is unilingually Finnish.

Services and sights

A paper mill is located in Tervakoski, the second largest village in the municipality. A well-known and popular amusement park Puuhamaa is also located in Tervakoski. Other sites of particular interest include the Hakoinen fortress hill and manor house, the latter being privately owned; the mediaeval stone church of St Lauri (Lawrence); the Torpparimuseo (authentic wooden village buildings and windmill); and numerous Bronze Age sacrifice stones, all in Janakkala village. The birthplace of an internationally known actress Ida Aalberg (1857-1915) is located in Leppäkoski village in Janakkala.

Heraldry
In the coat of arms of Janakkala, a head of Eurasian lynx (Lynx lynx), the regional animal of Tavastia Proper, describes Janakkala's location in the heart of Tavastia. An aisle line of partition is a reference to Hakoinen Castle into the mountain, and the upper two arrows encircling the cross, symbol of Christianity, the image of the Crusades battles.

See also
 Hattula
 Loppi

References

External links

Municipality of Janakkala – Official website 

 
Municipalities of Kanta-Häme
Populated places established in 1866
1866 establishments in the Russian Empire